Muricellisis is a genus of deep-sea bamboo coral in the family Isididae, containing two species:
Muricellisis cervicornis Thomson & Dean, 1931
Muricellisis echinata Kükenthal, 1915

References

Isididae
Octocorallia genera